The Middles is a village in County Durham, in England. It is situated between Stanley and Craghead.

References

Villages in County Durham
Stanley, County Durham